Antonín Dvořák wrote his first Cello Concerto in A major, B. 10 in 1865.

Background 
Unlike his famous B minor Cello Concerto, Op. 104, Dvořák's A major Concerto is traditionally overlooked, so much so that the later work is only rarely called "No. 2." There are two reasons for this fate for the three-movement earlier piece: Dvořák left it in piano-score form, un-orchestrated; and it sprawls to some 55 minutes, with outer movements about 25 and 21 minutes long, respectively.

Written for cellist Ludevít Peer, it was rediscovered by composer Günter Raphael years after Dvořák's death. Raphael orchestrated and heavily edited it in the late 1920s, making it more his own than Dvořák's. The 1970s brought a second editor, the Dvořák expert and curator Jarmil Burghauser, who, along with cellist Miloš Sádlo, prepared a more lightly rethought account published two ways: in an orchestration by Burghauser; and in the original piano-score form with cuts corresponding to the new orchestrated version. Burghauser took the liberty of shortening both outer movements. One can sample all three editions, since there are Supraphon recordings available (original and Burghauser) as well as Steven Isserlis's frequent touring with the Raphael version, released on Hyperion Records.

Recordings 
 CPO
 Ramon Jaffé, Cello. Rhine Philharmonic State Orchestra. Jarmil Burghauser version.
 Supraphon Label
 Jiří Bárta, Cello. Original form, for Cello and Piano.
 Miloš Sádlo, Cello. An orchestrated version by Jarmil Burghauser.
 Koch Classics
 Werner Thomas-Mifune, Cello. Burghauser version.
 Hyperion 
 Steven Isserlis, Cello. Mahler Chamber Orchestra conducted by Daniel Harding. Raphael version.

In 2010, the Czech cellist Tomas Jamnik recorded a new edition of the A major concerto with the Prague Radio Symphony Orchestra on the Supraphon label.  The performers here shorten the concerto to 35 minutes, sometimes following Burghauser, but sometimes, following extensive research by themselves, finding their own solutions to some of the problems caused by only having the piano score, rather than a full orchestral version.  On completion of the piano score, Dvořák would never go back to his "Concerto for 'Cello with piano accompaniment".

References

External links 
 Cello concerto in A major on a comprehensive Dvorak site
 Article on Steven Isserlis' Performance

Compositions by Antonín Dvořák
Dvorak Cello Concerto No.1, B.10
1865 compositions
Compositions in A major